Bern incident or Berne incident might refer to:

Operation Sunrise (World War II), a series of secret negotiations during World War II
1955 seizure of the Romanian embassy in Bern, known in Romania as the "Bern incident"
1982 seizure of the Polish embassy in Bern